Sarah Sansonetti (born 2 August 2001) is an Australian rules footballer playing for Collingwood in the AFL Women's (AFLW). She has previously played for Richmond.

AFLW career
Sansonetti was drafted by Richmond with their fourth selection and fortieth overall in the 2019 AFL Women's draft. She made her debut against Carlton at Ikon Park in the opening round of the 2020 season. In May 2022, she was delisted by Richmond after playing 17 games for the club.

In June 2022, Sansonetti was signed by Collingwood as a delisted free agent.

Statistics
Statistics are correct to the end of the S7 (2022) season

|- 
! scope="row" style="text-align:center" | 2020
|style="text-align:center;"|
| 18 || 6 || 0 || 0 || 11 || 26 || 37 || 2 || 25 || 0.0 || 0.0 || 1.8 || 4.3 || 6.2 || 0.3 || 4.2
|-
| scope="row" style="text-align:center" | 2021
|style="text-align:center;"|
| 18 || 3 || 0 || 0 || 7 || 11 || 18 || 2 || 2 || 0.0 || 0.0 || 2.3 || 3.7 || 6.0 || 0.7 || 0.7
|- 
| scope="row" text-align:center | 2022
| 
| 18 || 8 || 0 || 0 || 31 || 20 || 51 || 14 || 15 || 0.0 || 0.0 || 3.9 || 2.5 || 6.4 || 1.8 || 1.9
|- 
| scope="row" text-align:center | S7 (2022)
| 
| 16 || 10 || 0 || 1 || 49 || 23 || 72 || 27 || 23 || 0.0 || 0.1 || 4.9 || 2.3 || 7.2 || 2.7 || 2.3
|- 
|- class="sortbottom"
! colspan=3| Career
! 27
! 0
! 1
! 98
! 80
! 178
! 45
! 65
! 0.0
! 0.04
! 3.6
! 3.0
! 6.6
! 1.7
! 2.4
|}

References

External links 

 

2001 births
Living people
Richmond Football Club (AFLW) players
Northern Knights players (NAB League Girls)
Australian rules footballers from Victoria (Australia)